Alexa Glatch and Mashona Washington were the defending champions, but both players chose not to participate.

Anastasia Rodionova and Arina Rodionova won the title, defeating Elena Bovina and Edina Gallovits-Hall in the final, 6–2, 2–6, [10–6].

Seeds

Draw

References 
 Main draw

Party Rock Open - Doubles
Party Rock Open
2012 Party Rock Open